Olavarría Partido is a partido in the central region of Buenos Aires Province in Argentina.

Settlements
Olavarría
Blanca Grande
Cerro Sotuyo
Colonia Hinojo
Colonia Nieves
Durañona
Espigas
Hinojo
Iturregui
La Providencia
Loma Negra
Mapis
Muñoz
Colonia Las Carmelitas
Pourtalé
Recalde
Rocha
Colonia San Miguel
Santa Luisa
Sierra Chica
Sierras Bayas
Villa Alfredo Fortabat

External links

Olavarria Website (Spanish)
 Olavarria Municipal website (Spanish)
 Olavarria Website (Spanish)

1867 establishments in Argentina
Partidos of Buenos Aires Province
Volga German diaspora